Baishe  is a town-level administrative unit under the jurisdiction of Nanfeng County, Fuzhou City, Jiangxi Province, People's Republic of China. , it has one residential community and 32 villages under its administration: 

Community
 Baishe Community

Villages
 Baishe Village
 Fengjiang Village
 Hantou Village
 Chating Village
 Wangtian Village
 Sankeng Village
 Xiapi Village
 Yaopi Village
 Zhangjia Village
 Chidu Village
 Xiagan Village
 Shanggan Village
 Chenfang Village
 Tiandong Village
 Fangkeng Village
 Poyang Village
 Luofang Village
 Luojia Village
 Xiaoshi Village
 Jimin Village
 Zhuhu Village
 Jiangyuan Village
 Hedong Village
 Zhouyuan Village
 Shiyuan Village
 Guzhu Village
 Zoufang Village
 Zhonghe Village
 Qiaokou Village
 Yanglin Village
 Qixia Village
 Qiaotou Village

References 

Township-level divisions of Jiangxi
Nanfeng County